The Battle of Anzio was a battle of the Italian Campaign of World War II that took place from January 22, 1944 (beginning with the Allied amphibious landing known as Operation Shingle) to June 5, 1944 (ending  with the capture of Rome). The operation was opposed by German forces in the area of Anzio and Nettuno.

The operation was initially commanded by Major General John P. Lucas, of the U.S. Army, commanding U.S. VI Corps with the intent to outflank German forces at the Winter Line and enable an attack on Rome.

The success of an amphibious landing at that location, in a basin consisting substantially of reclaimed marshland and surrounded by mountains, depended on the element of surprise and the swiftness with which the invaders could build up strength and move inland relative to the reaction time and strength of the defenders. Any delay could result in the occupation of the mountains by the defenders and the consequent entrapment of the invaders. Lieutenant General Mark W. Clark, commander of the U.S. Fifth Army, understood that risk, but he did not pass on his appreciation of the situation to his subordinate Lucas, who preferred to take time to entrench against an expected counterattack. The initial landing achieved complete surprise with no opposition and a jeep patrol even made it as far as the outskirts of Rome. However, Lucas, who had little confidence in the operation as planned, failed to capitalize on the element of surprise and delayed his advance until he judged his position was sufficiently consolidated and he had sufficient strength.

While Lucas consolidated, Field Marshal Albert Kesselring, the German commander in the Italian theatre, moved every unit he could spare into a defensive ring around the beachhead. His artillery units had a clear view of every Allied position. The Germans also stopped the drainage pumps and flooded the reclaimed marsh with salt water, planning to entrap the Allies and destroy them by epidemic. For weeks a rain of shells fell on the beach, the marsh, the harbour, and on anything else observable from the hills, with little distinction between forward and rear positions.

After a month of heavy but inconclusive fighting, Lucas was relieved and sent home. His replacement was Major General Lucian Truscott, who had previously commanded the U.S. 3rd Infantry Division. The Allies broke out in May. But, instead of striking inland to cut lines of communication of the German Tenth Army's units fighting at Monte Cassino, Truscott, on Clark's orders, reluctantly turned his forces north-west towards Rome, which was captured on June 4, 1944. As a result, the forces of the German Tenth Army fighting at Cassino were able to withdraw and rejoin the rest of Kesselring's forces north of Rome, regroup, and make a fighting withdrawal to his next major prepared defensive position on the Gothic Line.

Background

At the end of 1943, following the Allied invasion of Italy, Allied forces were bogged down at the Gustav Line, a defensive line across Italy south of the strategic objective of Rome. The terrain of central Italy had proved ideally suited to defense, and Field Marshal Albert Kesselring took full advantage.

Operation Shingle was originally conceived by British Prime Minister Winston Churchill in December 1943, as he lay recovering from pneumonia in Marrakesh. His concept was to land two divisions at Anzio, bypassing German forces in central Italy, and take Rome, the strategic objective of the current Battle of Rome. By February he had recovered and was badgering his commanders for a plan of attack, accusing them of not wanting to fight but of being interested only in drawing pay and eating rations. General Harold Alexander, commander of the Allied Armies in Italy, had already considered such a plan since October using five divisions. However, the 5th Army did not have the troops nor the means to transport them. Clark proposed landing a reinforced division to divert German troops from Monte Cassino. This second landing, however, instead of failing similarly, would hold "the shingle" for a week in expectation of a breakthrough at Cassino, and so the operation was named Shingle.

The Anzio beachhead is at the northwestern end of a tract of reclaimed marshland, formerly the Pontine Marshes, now the Pontine Fields (Agro Pontino). Previously uninhabitable due to mosquitoes carrying malaria, in Roman times armies marched as quickly as possible across it on the military road, the Via Appia. The marsh was bounded on one side by the sea and the other by mountains: the Monti Albani, the Monti Lepini, the Monti Ausoni, and further south the Monti Aurunci (where the allies had been brought to a halt before Monte Cassino). Overall these mountains are referenced by the name Monti Laziali, the mountains of Lazio, the ancient Latium. Invading armies from the south had the choice of crossing the marsh or taking the only other road to Rome, the Via Latina, running along the eastern flanks of the Monti Laziali, risking entrapment. The marshes were turned into cultivatable land in the 1930s under Benito Mussolini. Canals and pumping stations were built to remove the brackish water from the land. These canals divided the land into personal tracts with new stone houses for colonists from northern Italy. Mussolini also founded the five cities destroyed by the battle.

When Lucian Truscott's 3rd Division was first selected for the operation, he pointed out to Clark that the position was a death trap and there would be no survivors. Agreeing, Clark canceled the operation, but Prime Minister Churchill revived it. The two allies had different concepts: the Americans viewed such a landing as another distraction from Cassino, but if they could not break through at Cassino, the men at Anzio would be trapped. Churchill and the British high command envisioned an outflanking movement ending with the capture of Rome. Mediterranean Theatre commander General Dwight D. Eisenhower, leaving to take command of Operation Overlord, left the decision up to Churchill with a warning about German unpredictability.

The final plan called for Lucas to lead the US VI Corps in a landing in the Anzio area, followed by an advance into the Alban Hills, to cut German communications and "threaten the rear of the German XIV Panzer Corps" (under Fridolin von Senger und Etterlin). It was hoped that such an advance would draw German forces away from the Monte Cassino area and facilitate an Allied breakthrough.

Plan
Planners argued that if Kesselring (in charge of German forces in Italy) pulled troops out of the Gustav Line to defend against the Allied assault, then Allied forces would be able to break through the line; if Kesselring didn't pull troops out of the Gustav Line, then Operation Shingle would threaten to capture Rome and cut off the German units defending the Gustav Line. Should Germany have adequate reinforcements available to defend both Rome and the Gustav Line, the Allies felt that the operation would nevertheless be useful in engaging forces which could otherwise be committed on another front. The operation was officially canceled on December 18, 1943. However, it was later reselected.

Clark did not feel he had the numbers on the southern front to exploit any breakthrough. His plan therefore was relying on the southern offensive drawing Kesselring's reserves in and providing the Anzio force the opportunity to break inland quickly. This would also reflect the orders he had received from Alexander to "...carry out an assault landing on the beaches in the vicinity of Rome with the object of cutting the enemy lines of communication and threatening the rear of the German XIV Corps [on the Gustav Line]." His written orders to Lucas did not really reflect this. Initially Lucas had received orders to "1. Seize and secure a beachhead in the vicinity of Anzio 2. Advance and secure Colli Laziali [the Alban Hills] 3. Be prepared to advance on Rome". Clark's final orders stated "...2. Advance on Colli Laziali" giving Lucas considerable flexibility as to the timing of any advance on the Alban Hills. It is likely that the caution displayed by both Clark and Lucas was to some extent a product of Clark's experiences at the tough battle for the Salerno beach head and Lucas' natural caution stemming from his lack of experience in battle.

Neither Clark nor Lucas had full confidence in either their superiors or the operational plan. Along with most of the Fifth Army staff they felt that Shingle was properly a two corps or even a full army task. A few days prior to the attack, Lucas wrote in his diary, "They will end up putting me ashore with inadequate forces and get me in a serious jam... Then, who will get the blame?" and "[The operation] has a strong odour of Gallipoli and apparently the same amateur was still on the coach's bench." The "amateur" can only have referred to Winston Churchill, architect of the disastrous Gallipoli landings of World War I and advocate of Shingle.

Availability of naval forces
One of the problems with the plan was the availability of landing ships. The American commanders in particular were determined that nothing should delay the Normandy invasion and the supporting landings in southern France. Operation Shingle would require the use of landing ships necessary for these operations. Initially Shingle was to release these assets by January 15. However, this being deemed problematic, President Roosevelt granted permission for the craft to remain until February 5.

Only enough tank landing ships (LSTs) to land a single division were initially available to Shingle. Later, at Churchill's personal insistence, enough were made available to land two divisions. Allied intelligence thought that five or six German divisions were in the area, although U.S. 5th Army intelligence severely underestimated the German 10th Army's fighting capacity at the time, believing many of their units would be worn out after the defensive battles fought since September.

Order of battle

Task Force 81

 Rear Admiral Frank J. Lowry, USN

 Allied forces landed: approx. 40,000 soldiers, and 5,000+ vehicles
 Naval losses: 2 light cruisers, 3 destroyers, 2 minesweepers, 1 hospital ship

"Peter" Force
 Rear Admiral Thomas Hope Troubridge
 Comprising 2 light cruisers, 12 destroyers, 2 anti-aircraft/fighter director ships, 2 gunboats, 6 minesweepers, 4 transports, 63 landing craft, 6 patrol craft, 1 oiler, 1 net tender, 2 tugs, 4 hospital ships, 1 submarine

 British 1st Infantry Division (Major General W.R.C. Penney)
 2nd Infantry Brigade
 1st Battalion, Loyal Regiment (North Lancashire)
 2nd Battalion, North Staffordshire Regiment
 6th Battalion, Gordon Highlanders
 3rd Infantry Brigade
 1st Battalion, Duke of Wellington's Regiment
 1st Battalion, King's Shropshire Light Infantry
 2nd Battalion, Sherwood Foresters
 24th Guards Brigade
 5th Battalion, Grenadier Guards
 1st Battalion, Irish Guards
 1st Battalion, Scots Guards
 1st Reconnaissance Regiment, Reconnaissance Corps
 2/7th Battalion, Middlesex Regiment
 2nd Field Regiment, Royal Artillery
 19th Field Regiment, Royal Artillery
 67th (South Midland) Field Regiment, Royal Artillery
 81st Anti-Tank Regiment, Royal Artillery
 90th Light Anti-Aircraft Regiment, Royal Artillery
 23rd Field Company, Royal Engineers
 238th Field Company, Royal Engineers
 248th Field Company, Royal Engineers
 6th Field Park Company, Royal Engineers
 1st Bridging Platoon, Royal Engineers
 1st Divisional Signals, Royal Corps of Signals
 46th (Liverpool Welsh) Royal Tank Regiment
 2nd Special Service Brigade (partial) (Brigadier R.J.F. Tod)
 No. 9 Commando
 No.43 (Royal Marine) Commando
 No 1, 2 & 3 Field Ambulance, Royal Army Medical Corps

Ranger Group

 Captain E.C.L. Turner, RN
 Comprising 1 transport, 1 submarine chaser, 7 landing craft

 Attacked the port of Anzio:
 6615th Ranger Force (Colonel William O. Darby)
 1st Ranger Battalion
 3rd Ranger Battalion
 4th Ranger Battalion
 509th Parachute Infantry Battalion (PIB)
 83rd Chemical Mortar Battalion
 93rd Evacuation Hospital
 95th Evacuation Hospital

"X-Ray" Force

 Rear Admiral Lowry
 Comprising 2 light cruisers, 11 destroyers, 2 destroyer escorts, 24 minesweepers, 166 landing craft, 20 subchasers, 3 tugs, 1 submarine, multiple salvage ships

US 3rd Infantry Division (Major General Lucian K. Truscott Jr.)
7th Infantry Regiment
 15th Infantry Regiment
 30th Infantry Regiment
 HHB Division Artillery
 9th Field Artillery Battalion (155mm)
 10th Field Artillery Battalion (105mm)
 39th Field Artillery Battalion (75mm and 105mm)
 41st Field Artillery Battalion (105mm)
 10th Engineer Battalion
 601st Tank Destroyer Battalion
 751st Tank Battalion
 441st AAA Automatic Weapons Battalion
 Battery B, 36th Field Artillery Regiment (155mm Gun)(Motorized)
 69th Armored Field Artillery Battalion
 84th Chemical Battalion (Motorized)
 504th Parachute Infantry Regiment

Southern attack 

The Fifth Army's attack on the Gustav Line began on January 16, 1944, at Monte Cassino. The operation failed to break through, but it partly succeeded in its primary objective. Heinrich von Vietinghoff, commanding the Gustav Line, called for reinforcements, and Kesselring transferred the 29th and 90th Panzergrenadier Divisions from Rome.

Battle

Initial landings

The landings began on January 22, 1944.

Although resistance had been expected, as seen at Salerno during 1943, the initial landings were essentially unopposed, with the exception of desultory Luftwaffe strafing runs.

By midnight, 36,000 soldiers and 3,200 vehicles had landed on the beaches. Thirteen Allied troops were killed, and 97 wounded; about 200 Germans had been taken as POWs.

In the first days of operations, the command of the Italian resistance movement had a meeting with the Allied General Headquarters: it offered to guide the Allied Force through the Alban Hills territory, but the Allied Command refused the proposal.

After the landings 
It is clear that Lucas' superiors expected some kind of offensive action from him. The point of the landing was to turn the German defences on the Winter Line, taking advantage of their exposed rear and hopefully panicking them into retreating northwards past Rome. However, Lucas instead poured more men and material into his tiny bridgehead, and strengthened his defences.

Winston Churchill was clearly displeased with this action. He said: "I had hoped we were hurling a wildcat into the shore, but all we got was a stranded whale".

Lucas' decision remains a controversial one. Noted military historian John Keegan wrote, "Had Lucas risked rushing at Rome the first day, his spearheads would probably have arrived, though they would have soon been crushed. Nevertheless he might have 'staked out claims well inland." However, "Lucas did not have confidence in the strategic planning of the operation. Also, he could certainly argue that his interpretation of his orders from Clark was not an unreasonable one. With two divisions landed, and facing two or three times that many Germans, it would have been reasonable for Lucas to consider the beachhead insecure." But according to Keegan, Lucas's actions "achieved the worst of both worlds, exposing his forces to risk without imposing any on the enemy."

Response of Axis forces 

Kesselring was informed of the landings at 3 a.m. January 22. Although the landings came as a surprise, Kesselring had made contingency plans to deal with possible landings at all the likely locations. All the plans relied on his divisions each having previously organised a motorized rapid reaction unit (Kampfgruppe) which could move speedily to meet the threat and buy time for the rest of the defenses to get in place. At 5 a.m. he initiated Operation "Richard" and ordered the Kampfgruppe of 4th Parachute Division and the Hermann Göring Fallschirm Panzer Division to defend the roads leading from Anzio to the Alban Hills via Campoleone and Cisterna whilst his plans expected some 20,000 defending troops to have arrived by the end of the first day. In addition, he requested that OKW send reinforcements, and in response to this they ordered the equivalent of more than three divisions from France, Yugoslavia, and Germany whilst at the same time releasing to Kesselring a further three divisions in Italy which had been under OKW's direct command. Later that morning, he ordered General Eberhard von Mackensen (Fourteenth Army) and General Heinrich von Vietinghoff (Tenth Army – Gustav Line) to send him additional reinforcements.

The German units in the immediate vicinity had in fact been dispatched to reinforce the Gustav Line only a few days earlier. All available reserves from the southern front or on their way to it were rushed toward Anzio and Nettuno; these included the 3rd Panzer Grenadier and 71st Infantry Divisions, and the bulk of the Luftwaffe's Hermann Göring Panzer Division. Kesselring initially considered that a successful defence could not be made if the Allies launched a major attack on January 23 or January 24. However, by the end of January 22, the lack of aggressive action convinced him that a defence could be made. Nevertheless, few additional defenders arrived on January 23, although the arrival on the evening of January 22 of Lieutenant General Alfred Schlemm and his 1st Parachute Corps headquarters brought greater organisation and purpose to the German defensive preparations. By January 24, the Germans had over 40,000 troops in prepared defensive positions.

Three days after the landings, the beachhead was surrounded by a defence line consisting of three divisions: The 4th Parachute Division to the west, the 3rd Panzer Grenadier Division to the center in front of Alban Hills, the Hermann Göring Panzer Division to the east.

Von Mackensen's 14th Army assumed overall control of the defence on January 25. Elements of eight German divisions were employed in the defence line around the beachhead, and five more divisions were on their way to the Anzio area. Kesselring ordered an attack on the beachhead for January 28, though it was postponed to February 1.

Liberty ship involvement
Liberty ships, which were never intended as warships, were involved in some fighting during the Battle of Anzio. It endured a prolonged barrage of shrapnel, machine-gun fire and bombs. The gun crew fought back with shellfire and shot down five German planes.

Allied offensive 

Further troop movements including the arrival of U.S. 45th Infantry Division and U.S. 1st Armored Division, brought Allied forces total on the beachhead to 69,000 men, 508 guns and 208 tanks by January 29, whilst the total defending Germans had risen to 71,500. Lucas initiated a two-pronged attack on January 30. While one force was to cut Highway 7 at Cisterna di Latina before moving east into the Alban Hills, a second was to advance northeast up the Via Anziate towards Campoleone.

Battle of Campoleone 
In heavy fighting British 1st Division made ground but failed to take Campoleone and ended the battle in an exposed salient stretching up the Via Anziate.

Battle of Cisterna

On the right, ahead of the main assault, two Ranger battalions made a daring covert advance towards Cisterna. Due to faulty intelligence, when daylight arrived they were engaged and cut off. A brutal battle with elements of the Fallschirm-Panzer Division 'Hermann Göring' followed. Rangers began surrendering individually or in small groups prompting others, acting on their own authority, to shoot them. Of the 767 men in the 1st and 3rd Ranger Battalions, six returned to the Allied lines and 761 were killed or captured.

German counterattacks
By early February, German forces in Fourteenth Army numbered some 100,000 troops organised into two Army Corps, the 1st Parachute Corps under Schlemm and the LXXVI Panzer Corps under Lieutenant General Traugott Herr. Allied forces by this time totalled 76,400 (including the recently arrived British 56th Infantry Division, under Major-General Gerald Templer, which arrived complete on February 16). After making exploratory probes on the Campoleone salient on the afternoon of February 3 the German forces launched a full counterattack at 23:00 in order to reduce the salient and "iron out" the front line. Von Mackensen had planned for the salient to be ground away rather than employing a rapid, focused thrust to cut it off. Some hours after the attack started the coherence of the front line had been completely shattered, and the fighting for the salient had given way to small unit actions, swaying back and forth through the gullies. In the morning of February 4 the situation was becoming more serious, with the 1st Battalion, Irish Guards (of 24th Guards Brigade), only having one cohesive rifle company left and on the opposite side of the salient, the 6th Battalion, Gordon Highlanders (of 2nd Brigade) was beginning to crumble and later lost three complete companies as prisoners.

Even though the base of the salient was nearly broken, Lucas was able to bolster the British 1st Division's defenses with the newly arrived 168th Brigade (from the 56th Division, containing 1st Battalion, London Irish Rifles, 1st Battalion, London Scottish, 10th Battalion, Royal Berkshire Regiment). The 3rd Brigade had been tasked with holding the tip of the salient 2 miles long and 1,000 yards wide on the road going north of Campoleone, but after the German attacks in the early hours of 4 February, the 2nd Battalion, Sherwood Foresters, 1st Battalion, King's Shropshire Light Infantry and 1st Battalion, Duke of Wellington's Regiment (all of 3rd Brigade) had been cut off and were surrounded in the pocket. They held the line all day, taking heavy casualties, but were eventually ordered to pull back and made a fighting retreat at 5pm to the Factory with the aid of artillery, and a successful assault launched by the London Scottish, of 168th Brigade, supported by the 46th Royal Tank Regiment (46 RTR).

From February 5 to February 7 both sides employed heavy artillery concentrations and bombers to disrupt the other side and at 21:00 on February 7 the Germans renewed their attack. Once more the fighting was fierce and they managed to infiltrate between the 5th Battalion, Grenadier Guards (24th Guards Brigade) and the 2nd Battalion, North Staffordshire Regiment (2nd Brigade) and nearly surrounded them; it was for his leadership of British counterattacks during this period that Major William Sidney, a company commander in the 5th Grenadier Guards, was later awarded the Victoria Cross. Slowly the Allies were forced to give ground and by February 10 they had been pushed out of the salient. Lucas ordered attacks on February 11 to regain the lost ground but the Germans, forewarned by a radio intercept, repelled the Allies' poorly coordinated attack.

On February 16, the Germans launched a new offensive (Operation Fischfang) down the line of the Via Anziate, supported by Tiger tanks. They overran the 167th Brigade, of the recently arrived 56th (London) Division, and virtually destroyed X and Y Companies of the 8th Battalion, Royal Fusiliers, each of which was reduced from around 125 down to a single officer and 10 other ranks. One of the men killed was Second Lieutenant Eric Waters, whose son Roger Waters of Pink Floyd, created a song (When the Tigers Broke Free) in memory of his father and describes his death.

By February 18, after desperate fighting, the Allies' Final Beachhead Line (prepared defenses more or less on the line of the original beachhead) was under attack. Numerous attacks were launched on 1st Battalion, Loyal Regiment (2nd Brigade) and they lost a company, overrun, and the day after had suffered 200 casualties. On the same day Major-General Ronald Penney, General Officer Commanding (GOC) British 1st Division, had been wounded by shellfire and the division was temporarily commanded by Major-General Templer, GOC 56th (London) Division, which had arrived complete. However, a counterattack using VI Corps' reserves halted the German advance, and on February 20, Fischfang petered out with both sides exhausted. During Fischfang the Germans had sustained some 5,400 casualties, the Allies 3,500. Both had suffered nearly 20,000 casualties each since the first landings, and it was "far the highest density of destruction in the Italian campaign, perhaps in the whole war". Also on February 18 while returning to Anzio the light cruiser  was struck by two torpedoes and sunk with a loss of 417 men. Despite the exhausted state of the troops, Hitler insisted that 14th Army should continue to attack. Despite the misgivings of both Kesselring and von Mackensen, a further assault was mounted on February 29, this time on LXXVI Panzer Corps' front around Cisterna. This push achieved little except to generate a further 2,500 casualties for the 14th Army.

Some RSI Italian units fought in the Anzio-Nettuno area, especially since March; the land units were part of the German 14th Army: only the paratroopers of the "Nembo" Battalion were there since February, participating in the German counterattack. In March the infantrymen of the "Barbarigo" Battalion (from Decima Flottiglia MAS) joined the frontline along the Canale Mussolini.

Lucas replaced 

Churchill had continued to bridle at Lucas' perceived passivity. He had written on February 10 to General Alexander encouraging him to exert his authority and Alexander had visited the beachhead on February 14 to tell Lucas he wished for a breakout as soon as the tactical situation allowed. After his visit Alexander wrote to the Chief of the Imperial General Staff, Alan Brooke, saying:

Lucas wrote in his diary on February 15:

On February 16 at a high level conference hosted by Alexander and attended by Mark W. Clark and Henry Maitland Wilson, commander Allied Force Headquarters it was decided to appoint two deputies under Lucas, Lucian Truscott and the British Major-General Vyvyan Evelegh. On February 22, Clark replaced Lucas with Truscott, appointing Lucas deputy commander Fifth Army until such time as a suitable job could be found for him back in the United States.

Stalemate: planning for Operation Diadem

Both sides had realised that no decisive result could be achieved until the spring and reverted to a defensive posture involving aggressive patrolling and artillery duels whilst they worked to rebuild their fighting capabilities. In anticipation of the following spring, Kesselring ordered the preparation of a new defence line, the Caesar C line, behind the line of beachhead running from the mouth of the river Tiber just south of Rome through Albano, skirting south of the Alban Hills to Valmontone and across Italy to the Adriatic coast at Pescara, behind which 14th Army and, to their left, 10th Army might withdraw when the need arose. Meanwhile, Lucian Truscott, who had been promoted from the command of U.S. 3rd Infantry Division to replace Lucas as commander of VI Corps on February 22, worked with his staff on the plans for a decisive attack as part of a general offensive which Alexander was planning for May and which would include a major offensive on the Gustav Line, Operation Diadem. The objective of the plan was to fully engage Kesselring's armies with a major offensive and remove any prospect of the Germans withdrawing forces from Italy to redeploy elsewhere. It was also intended to trap the bulk of the German 10th Army between the Allied forces advancing through the Gustav Line and VI Corps thrusting inland from Anzio.

In March, the 2nd Italian SS "Vendetta" Battalion and 29th Italian SS Rifle Battalion were sent to fight against the Anglo-American forces at the Anzio beachhead. Dispersed among German battalions, the German commanding officers later gave the Italians companies favourable reports. Members of former Blackshirt Lieutenant-Colonel Degli Oddi's "Vendetta" helped defeat a determined effort by the U.S. 3rd Infantry Division to overrun their positions and captured a number of prisoners. Their  performance at Anzio led to designation as units of the Waffen-SS, with all the duties and rights that that entailed.

The next few weeks saw many changes in divisions on both sides. The U.S. 504th Parachute Infantry Regiment, which had fought with distinction but suffered heavy losses, was withdrawn to England on 23 March 1944. Also in March the U.S. 34th Infantry Division and in early May, U.S. 36th Infantry Division, had arrived at Anzio. On the British side the 24th Guards Brigade of British 1st Infantry Division was replaced in the first week of March by 18th Infantry Brigade (from British 1st Armoured Division in North Africa). The Guards Brigade had suffered devastating casualties (nearly 2,000 of an initial strength of over 2,500) in just less than two months at Anzio. In late March the 56th (London) Infantry Division had also been relieved, after sustaining very heavy losses (one of its battalions — 7th Ox and Bucks of 167th (London) Brigade — had been reduced from 1,000  to 60), by British 5th Infantry Division. By late May, there were some 150,000 Allied troops in the bridgehead, including five U.S. and two British divisions, facing five German divisions. The Germans were well dug into prepared defenses, but were weak in numbers of officers and NCOs and, by the time of the late May offensive, lacked any reserves (which had all been sent south to the Gustav fighting).

Despite Alexander's overall plan for Diadem requiring VI Corps to strike inland and cut Route 6, Clark asked Truscott to prepare alternatives and to be ready to switch from one to another at 48 hours' notice. Of the four scenarios prepared by Truscott, Operation Buffalo called for an attack through Cisterna, into the gap in the hills and to cut Route 6 at Valmontone. Operation Turtle on the other hand foresaw a main thrust to the left of the Alban Hills taking Campoleone, Albano and on to Rome. On May 5, Alexander selected Buffalo and issued Clark with orders to this effect.

However, Clark was determined that VI Corps should strike directly for Rome as evidenced in his later writing: "We not only wanted the honor of capturing Rome, but felt that we deserved it... Not only did we intend to become the first army to seize Rome from the south, but we intended to see that people at home knew that it was the Fifth Army that did the job, and knew the price that had been paid for it." He argued to Alexander that VI Corps did not have the strength to trap the German 10th Army and Alexander, instead of making his requirements clear, was conciliatory and gave the impression that a push on Rome was still a possibility if Buffalo ran into difficulties. On May 6, Clark informed Truscott that "..the capture of Rome is the only important objective and to be ready to execute Turtle as well as Buffalo".

Truscott's planning for Buffalo was meticulous: British 5th Division and 1st Division on the left were to attack along the coast and up the Via Anziate to pin the German 4th Parachute, 65th Infantry and 3rd Panzergrenadier in place whilst the U.S. 45th Infantry, 1st Armored and 3rd Infantry Divisions would launch the main assault, engaging the German 362nd and 715th Infantry Divisions and striking towards Campoleone, Velletri and Cisterna respectively. On the Allies' far right, the 1st Special Service Force would protect the American assault's flank.

Breakout
At 5:45 a.m. May 23, 1944, 1,500 Allied artillery pieces commenced bombardment. Forty minutes later the guns paused as attacks were made by close air support and then resumed as the infantry and armour moved forward. The first day's fighting was intense: the 1st Armored Division lost 100 tanks and 3rd Infantry Division suffered 955 casualties. The Germans suffered too, with the 362nd Infantry Division estimated to have lost 50% of its fighting strength.

Mackensen had been convinced that the Allies' main thrust would be up the Via Anziate, and the ferocity of the British feint on May 23 and 24 did nothing to persuade him otherwise.

In the afternoon of May 25, Cisterna finally fell to the 3rd Division, who had to go from house to house winkling out the German 362nd Infantry, which had refused to withdraw and, as a consequence, had virtually ceased to exist by the end of the day. By the end of May 25, 3rd Infantry were heading into the Velletri gap near Cori, and elements of 1st Armored had reached within  of Valmontone and were in contact with units of the Hermann Göring Division which were just starting to arrive from Leghorn. Although VI Corps had suffered over 3,300 casualties in the three days fighting, Operation Buffalo was going to plan, and Truscott was confident that a concerted attack by 1st Armored and 3rd Infantry Divisions the next day would get his troops astride Route 6.

On the evening of May 25, Truscott received new orders from Clark via his Operations Officer, Brigadier General Don Brand. These were, in effect, to implement Operation Turtle and turn the main line of attack 90 degrees to the left. Most importantly, although the attack towards Valmontone and Route 6 would continue, 1st Armored were to withdraw to prepare to exploit the planned breakthrough along the new line of attack leaving 3rd Division to continue towards Valmontone with 1st Special Service Force in support. Clark informed Alexander of these developments late in the morning of May 26 by which time the change of orders was a fait accompli.

At the time, Truscott was shocked, writing later

...I was dumbfounded. This was no time to drive to the north-west where the enemy was still strong; we should pour our maximum power into the Valmontone Gap to ensure the destruction of the retreating German Army. I would not comply with the order without first talking to General Clark in person. ... [However] he was not on the beachhead and could not be reached even by radio... such was the order that turned the main effort of the beachhead forces from the Valmontone Gap and prevented destruction of the German Tenth Army. On the 26th the order was put into effect.

He went on to write

There has never been any doubt in my mind that had General Clark held loyally to General Alexander's instructions, had he not changed the direction of my attack to the north-west on May 26, the strategic objectives of Anzio would have been accomplished in full. To be first in Rome was a poor compensation for this lost opportunity.

On May 26, while the VI Corps was initiating its difficult maneuver, Kesselring threw elements of four divisions into the Velletri gap to stall the advance on Route 6. For four days they slugged it out against 3rd Division until finally withdrawing on May 30, having kept Route 6 open and allowed seven divisions from 10th Army to withdraw and head north of Rome.

On the new axis of attack little progress was made until 1st Armored were in position on May 29, when the front advanced to the main Caesar C Line defences. Nevertheless, an early breakthrough seemed unlikely until on May 30 Major General Fred L. Walker's 36th Division found a gap in the Caesar Line at the join between 1st Parachute Corps and LXXVI Panzer Corps. Climbing the steep slopes of Monte Artemisio they threatened Velletri from the rear and obliged the defenders to withdraw. This was a key turning point, and von Mackensen offered his resignation which Kesselring accepted.

Raising the pressure further, Clark assigned U.S. II Corps which, fighting its way along the coast from the Gustav Line, had joined up with VI Corps on May 25 to attack around the right hand side of the Alban Hills and advance along the line of Route 6 to Rome

On June 2 the Caesar Line collapsed under the mounting pressure, and 14th Army commenced a fighting withdrawal through Rome. On the same day Hitler, fearing another Stalingrad, had ordered Kesselring that there should be "no defence of Rome". Over the next day, the rearguards were gradually overwhelmed, and Rome was entered in the early hours of June 4 with Clark holding an impromptu press conference on the steps of the Town Hall on the Capitoline Hill that morning. He ensured the event was a strictly American affair by stationing military police at road junctions to refuse entry to the city by British military personnel.

Aftermath

Although controversy continues regarding what might have happened if Lucas had been more aggressive from the start, most commentators agree that the initial plan for Anzio was flawed. They question whether the initial landing of just over two infantry divisions, with no supporting armour, had the strength to achieve the objectives: of cutting Route 6 and then holding off the inevitable counterattacks that would come, as Kesselring redeployed his forces.

Volume 5 of Churchill's The Second World War is riddled with implied criticism of Lucas, blaming the failure on his caution. After the war, Kesselring gave his evaluation:

Furthermore, Field Marshal Sir Harold Alexander, in his Official Dispatch, stated, "The actual course of events was probably the most advantageous in the end."

Churchill defended the operation and believed that sufficient forces were available. He had clearly made great political efforts to procure certain resources, especially the extra LSTs needed to deliver a second division to shore, but also specific units useful to the attack such as with the 504th Parachute Infantry Regiment. He argued that even regardless of the tactical outcome of the operation, there was immediate strategic benefit with regard to the wider war. After the landings, the German High Command dropped its plans to transfer five of Kesselring's best divisions to Northwestern Europe. That obviously benefited the upcoming Operation Overlord. Churchill also had to ensure the British-dominated forces in Italy were contributing to the war at a time when the Soviet Red Army were suffering tremendous losses on the Eastern Front.

Because of Clark's change of plan, Operation Diadem (during which the U.S. Fifth Army and the British Eighth Army sustained 44,000 casualties) failed in its objective of destroying the German 10th Army. It also condemned the Allies to another year of bloody combat in Italy, notably around the Gothic Line from August 1944 through March 1945.

The greatest loss was that if the U.S. Army VI Corps main effort had continued on the Valmontone axis from May 26, Clark could probably have reached Rome more quickly than by the route northwest from Cisterna. The VI Corps could also have cut Highway 6 and then put much more pressure on the 10th Army than it actually did.

Alan Whicker, who was a war correspondent with the British Army's Film and Photo Unit and was present during the fighting, later said:

The news cycle was similarly unkind to Clark. Just 2 days after his staged press conference on Rome's Capitolium, the "advance" was relegated to the back pages as reporting on the Normandy D Day invasion took center stage June 6.

Notable participants
 British actor Christopher Lee Participated in this battle in the No. 260 Squadron RAF.
 James Arness, actor best known for portraying Marshal Matt Dillon on the television series Gunsmoke for 20 years. Arness served in the United States Army during World War II and was severely wounded on the frontline of Anzio, serving with the 3rd Infantry Division, leading to a lifelong slight limp.
 James Chichester-Clark, Baron Moyola, a newly commissioned officer serving in the 1st Battalion, Irish Guards of 24th Guards Brigade of British 1st Infantry Division, who was later the fifth Prime Minister of Northern Ireland and eighth leader of the Ulster Unionist Party.
 Chester Cruikshank, twice United States hammer throw champion, received the Distinguished Service Cross for his actions in the Anzio-Nettuno area.
 Denis Healey, later a Labour Party Defence Minister and Chancellor of the Exchequer, was the Military Landing Officer for the British assault brigade at Anzio.
 Hamish Henderson, noted Scottish communist and folklorist, was an intelligence officer at Anzio, where he interrogated German prisoners. It was at Anzio that he heard the tune "The Bloody Fields of Flanders", to which he later set alternative Scottish national and internationalist anthem "Freedom Come-All-Ye".
 Bill Mauldin, noted cartoonist, creator of Willie and Joe, who appeared in the American Army newspaper Stars and Stripes, was in the Anzio-Nettuno area, serving with the 45th Infantry Division.
 Audie Murphy, Hollywood actor. Murphy became the most decorated United States combat soldier in United States military history. He received the Medal of Honor, the U.S. military's highest award for valor, along with 32 additional U.S. medals. He served with Company B, 1st Battalion, 15th Infantry Regiment, 3rd Infantry Division.
 Major William Sidney, awarded the Victoria Cross for actions with the 5th Battalion, Grenadier Guards in the Anzio beachhead. Sidney's father in law, Lord Gort, also had been awarded the Victoria Cross in the First World War.
 BBC reporter Alan Whicker was at Anzio as a member of the British Army Film and Photo Unit. His 2004 documentary Whicker's War describes his experiences there.
 William Woodruff (1916–2008), writer and historian, was a Major in the 24th Guards Brigade of the British 1st Infantry Division at Anzio. His book 'Vessel of Sadness' is based on his experience of the battle.
 Eric Fletcher Waters (1913–1944), the father of Pink Floyd bassist Roger Waters and a 2nd Lieutenant with the Royal Fusiliers, died at Anzio. Waters' death and the battle inspired his musician son to write several songs over his career, including "When The Tigers Broke Free" for the band's 1982 film, Pink Floyd – The Wall.
 General John William Vessey Jr., the tenth Chairman of the Joint Chiefs of Staff. He was member of the 34th Infantry Division, and during the Battle of Anzio, he received a battlefield commission from first sergeant to second lieutenant.

References

Explanatory footnotes

Citations

Bibliography

Further reading

External links

 
 
 
 The official history of the London Irish Rifles containing an account of the unit's participation in the Anzio battle
 Anzio 1944 – German 10. Armee and 14. Armee European Center of Military History

Battle of Anzio
Battle of Anzio
Battles of World War II involving Canada
Battles of World War II involving the United States
Naval battles and operations of the European theatre of World War II
World War II operations and battles of the Italian Campaign
Amphibious operations of World War II
Amphibious operations involving the United Kingdom
Amphibious operations involving the United States
Anzio